El Gambole is a town located in Middle Shabelle, Hirshabelle State in Somalia.

Overview

References 

Populated places in Somalia